Motion Induced Blindness (MIB) is a phenomenon of visual disappearance or perceptual illusions observed in the lab, in which stationary visual stimuli disappear as if erased in front of an observer's eyes when masked with a moving background. Most recent research has shown that microsaccades counteract disappearance but are neither necessary nor sufficient to account for MIB.

Overview
Motion-induced blindness was originally discovered by Grindley and Townsend in 1965, followed by Ramachandran and Gregory in 1991. However it was given more attention and named when rediscovered by Bonneh, Cooperman, and Sagi in 2001. The researchers originally attributed its causes strictly to attentional mechanisms, seeing the visual system as operating in a winner-takes-it-all manner.

Troxler's fading, discovered by Troxler in 1804, is a very similar phenomenon in which an object away from one's focus of attention disappears and reappears irregularly. There is no necessity for a moving background for this illusion to occur. Other similar phenomena in which salient stimuli disappear and reappear include binocular rivalry, discovered as early as 1593, monocular rivalry, and flash suppression.

Causes
The illusion catches the brain ignoring or discarding information. This may be one of the brain's useful tricks, a deficiency - or perhaps both. An ongoing debate regarding the causes of MIB is still present in today's vision research, however the purely attentional mechanism explanation has been rejected and new theories were put forward.

Interhemispheric Switch
There is a correlation between an individual's switch rate during binocular rivalry and the rate of disappearance and reappearance in MIB in the same individual. This is most evident when the investigation involves an adequate sample from the 8-10X range of switch rates in the human population. In addition, TMS, Transcranial Magnetic Stimulation interruption of the MIB cycle is specific jointly, for both the hemisphere receiving the TMS pulse and the phase of the MIB cycle, with the disappearance phase susceptible to interruption via Left hemisphere TMS and the reappearance phase susceptible to Right hemisphere interruption. In this way, MIB is like binocular rivalry, where hemispheric manipulations using caloric vestibular stimulation (or TMS) also require the correct combination of cerebral hemisphere and phase (1/4 possibilities).

From these observations, it can be argued that MIB is an interhemispheric switching phenomenon, an unexpected member of the class of rhythmic, biphasic, perceptual rivalries such as binocular rivalry and plaid motion rivalry. In this formulation, the disappearance in MIB can be understood in terms of the cognitive style of the Left hemisphere, which chooses a single possibility from the many, and ignores or "denies" the others (denial being one of the characteristic defence mechanisms of the Left, which becomes exaggerated in the Left hemisphere bias of mania). MIB reappearance is attributable to the Right hemisphere, whose "discrepancy detector" cognitive style assesses all possibilities, and therefore disagrees with the biased decision to ignore the bright yellow stimulus. A corollary of this formulation is a predictable connection between MIB and mood, which was successfully tested on thousands of viewers watching ABC TV's Catalyst Program in Australia, where longer disappearance phases were observed in euphoric individuals and very short, or absent, disappearances were a feature of the dysphoria of stress, trauma and depression.

Surface completion
Numerous psychophysical findings emphasize the importance of surface completion and depth cues in visual perception. Thus, if MIB is affected by these factors it will regulate in accordance to simple occlusion principles. In their study, Graf et al. (2002) stereoscopically presented a moving grid stimulus set behind, in front of, or in the same plane as the static dots. They then showed involuntary completion of the grid elements into a surface interacting with the static targets - creating an illusion of occlusion. When the grid appeared in front of the targets the proportion of disappearance was larger than when it was behind or on the same plane. Although to a lesser extent, MIB did nonetheless occur in the conditions where the perceptual occlusion was not taking place (targets were in front of the mask).

The effect of interposition and perceived depth on target disappearance in MIB was also shown in a study done by Hsu et al. (2010) where a concave target appearing behind its surrounding disappeared more frequently than a convex one appearing in front of the mask. These effects, albeit being less significant, were replicated in similar settings without the use of motion.

The above experiments show that surface completion and simple occlusion precepts can predictably modulate MIB. However. they do not explain the origin of MIB, and may only be evoking other processes contingent upon it. Moreover, the surface completion theory does not explain the role of motion in this phenomenon.

Perceptual filling-in
Hsu et al. (2004) compared MIB to a similar phenomenon of perceptual filling-in (PFI), which likewise reveals a striking dissociation between the percept and the sensory input. They describe both as visual attributes which are perceived in a certain region of the visual field regardless of being in the background (in the same manner as colour, brightness or texture) thus inducing target disappearance. They argue that because in both MIB and PFI the disappearance; or the incorporation of the background motion stimuli; becomes more profound with an increase in eccentricity, decrease in contrast and when perceptual grouping with other stimuli is controlled for; the two illusions are very likely to be a result of intermutual processes. Since MBI and PFI show to be structurally similar, it seems plausible that MIB can be a phenomenon responsible for completing missing information across the blind spot and scotomas where motion is involved.

Motion streak suppression
Rather than a deficiency of our visual processing, MIB may be a functional side effect of the visual system's attempt to facilitate a better perception of movement. Wallis and Arnold (2009) propose a plausible explanation of target disappearance in MIB by linking it to the processes responsible for motion streak suppression. In their view, target disappearance is a side effect of our vision's attempt to provide an apparent perception of moving form. MIB shows to be hindered at equiluminance and augmented at the trailing edges of movement, all reminiscent of motion streak suppression. It appears that what drives MIB is a competition between a neural signal sensitive to spatiotemporal luminance and one responding to proximate stationary targets; where the stronger signal eventuates with what we actually perceive at any given moment (Donner et al., 2008).

Perceptual scotoma
A different explanatory approach by New and Scholl (2008) proposes that the phenomenon is another instance of our visual system's endeavor to provide clear and accurate perception. Because the static targets appear to be invariant with respect to the background motion, the visual system removes them from our awareness, discarding it as being contrary to the logic of perception and real life situations; thus treating it as a piece of disaffiliated retina or a scotoma. Consistent with this account is the fact that targets which are stabilized on the retina are more likely to be induced to disappearance than the ones moving across the retina.

Implications
MIB reveals that the brain uses mental models in order to process reality. The phenomenon also enables researchers to study consciousness, and attention with objective methods.

As the phenomenon was discovered so recently, researchers have speculated about whether MIB occurs outside the laboratory, without being noticed as such. Situations such as driving, in which some night drivers should see stationary red tail lights of the preceding cars disappear temporally when they attend to the moving stream of lights from oncoming traffic may be case points.

See also
 Binocular rivalry
 Flash suppression
 Monocular rivalry
 Motion-induced interocular suppression
 Troxler's fading
 Visual perception

References

Optical illusions
Binocular rivalry